The National Football League (NFL) is a professional American football league, which as of the end of its 2021 season, consists of 32 teams. These teams are divided equally between the National Football Conference (NFC) and the American Football Conference (AFC), and both conferences contain four divisions with four teams each. Since its formation in 1920, as the American Professional Football Association (APFA), NFL game results have been recorded. Games in the NFL can either end with a winner and a loser, or the two teams can tie. Ties are registered as a half-win and a half-loss when calculating the win–loss percentage.

One of only two charter members of the NFL still in existence, the Chicago Bears have played the most games (1,452) and recorded the most ties (42) in NFL regular season history. Their NFC North divisional rivals, the Green Bay Packers have recorded the most wins (790) in NFL history. The league's other still-active charter member, the Arizona Cardinals, have recorded the most regular season losses (790), through the end of the 2022 season. The Dallas Cowboys hold the highest regular season win–loss percentage, with a 550–408–6 record through the end of the 2022 season. The Tampa Bay Buccaneers maintain the lowest regular season win–loss percentage, holding a 299–442–1 record through 2022. Being the most-recently founded franchise in the NFL, the Houston Texans have recorded the fewest games played (338) and wins (142). The Baltimore Ravens have recorded the fewest losses (190). Through the end of the 2022 regular season, the Jacksonville Jaguars are the only team yet to record a tie.

Following the regular season, teams that won their respective divisions, in addition to three wild card teams determined by a conference's next best three teams—regardless of division—qualify for the league's postseason, called the playoffs. Ties cannot occur in the playoffs. The Dallas Cowboys have played in the most playoff games (65), through the end of 2022–23 NFL Wild Card round. The New England Patriots have the most playoff wins (37) and the highest playoff win–loss percentage, with a 37–22 record, as of the end of the same Wild Card round. The Minnesota Vikings have recorded the most playoff losses (31), whereas the Detroit Lions have the lowest playoff win–loss percentage, holding a 7–13 record. The Houston Texans have the fewest games played (10), wins (4), and losses (6) in NFL playoff history. 

The NFL officially counts and includes the statistical records logged by teams that played in the American Football League (AFL) as part of NFL history. Therefore, these teams' pre-merger win–loss records are accounted for. However, the NFL does not officially count All-America Football Conference statistics, despite the 1950 NFL–AAFC merger.

Regular season

The following is a listing of all 32 current National Football League (NFL) teams ranked by their regular season win–loss record percentage, accurate as of the end of week 18 of the 2021 NFL season.

Playoffs

The following is a listing of all 32 current National Football League (NFL) teams ranked by their playoff win–loss percentage, accurate as of the end of the 2022–23 AFC and NFC Conference Championship Games.

Notes

References

National Football League lists
NFL
National Football League records and achievements